Al-Adharib is a sub-district located in Ba'dan District, Ibb Governorate, Yemen. Al-Adharib had a population of 5257 as of 2004.

References 

Sub-districts in Ba'dan District